Oh Jeong-bok (born October 13, 1986) is a South Korean professional baseball outfielder. He joined Samsung Lions in 2009. After that, he belonged to NC Dinos in 2012, and he moved to Korean Police Baseball Team in 2012. He moved to NC Dinos again in 2014. Then he moved to KT Wiz in 2015. He graduated Inha University.

References

External links 

 Jeong-bok Oh on Baseball Reference

Baseball outfielders
KT Wiz players
1986 births
Living people
People from Gimhae
Sportspeople from South Gyeongsang Province